A medium-altitude long-endurance unmanned aerial vehicle flies at an altitude window of 10,000 to 30,000 feet (3,000–9,000 m) for extended durations of time, typically 24 to 48 hours. This list includes both unmanned combat aerial vehicle and unmanned reconnaissance aerial vehicle.

References